The 1962 NBA World Championship Series was the championship round of the 1962 NBA Playoffs, which concluded the National Basketball Association (NBA)'s 1961–62 season. The best-of-seven series was played between the Western Division champion Los Angeles Lakers and Eastern Division champion Boston Celtics. This was the Celtics' sixth straight trip to the Finals, and they won the best-of-seven series in Game 7, 110–107 in overtime. It was the second time in NBA history and the most recent Finals in which the series was decided by overtime in Game 7. The only other Finals series decided in overtime in the seventh game was the 1957 Finals.

Series summary 

Celtics win series 4–3

Team rosters

Boston Celtics

Los Angeles Lakers

Records 

During the series, Lakers forward Elgin Baylor scored a Finals record 61 points in Game 5 and 284 points total in the series. Celtics center Bill Russell set a still-standing record for rebounds in a 7-game series with 189, and tied his own record for rebounds in a single game with 40 in Game 7.

The potential championship-winner bounces off the rim 

In the last 5 seconds of regulation in Game 7, Laker Frank Selvy missed an open 12-footer from the baseline that would have won the championship for Los Angeles and ended the Celtics dynasty. Instead, the game went into OT in which the Celtics then won the game and thus the title. For the Lakers, it would start the pattern of not winning the big games in the NBA Finals, something that lasted until 1972 when the Lakers finally won their first title in Los Angeles. The Lakers would not defeat the Celtics in the NBA Finals until 1985, which they did on the Celtics' home floor; they lost to the Boston Celtics in 1963, 1965, 1966, 1968, 1969, 1984 and 2008. After the 1985 Finals, the Lakers would beat the Celtics in the NBA Finals again in 1987 and 2010, both times in California.

See also
1962 NBA Playoffs
1961-62 NBA season

References 

Other sources
"1961-62 NBA Season Summary", basketball-reference.com. Retrieved March 28, 2014.

External links
 Sports Illustrated (April 30, 1962) Too Much To Beat This Year 
 1962 Finals at NBA.com
 1962 NBA Playoffs at Basketball-Reference.com

Finals
National Basketball Association Finals
NBA
NBA
NBA Finals
NBA Finals
NBA Finals
Basketball competitions in Boston
Basketball competitions in Los Angeles
1960s in Boston
NBA Finals